Joy Corning (September 7, 1932 – May 20, 2017) was an American politician who served as Lieutenant Governor of Iowa. A Republican, she was a native of Cedar Falls, Iowa. She graduated from the University of Northern Iowa in Cedar Falls.

Early political career
Prior to being elected lieutenant governor in 1990, Corning served as a state senator representing what was then Senate District 12 in Black Hawk County. She also served as the president of the Cedar Falls School Board, and worked as the director of the Iowa Housing Finance Authority from 1981 to 1984.

Female firsts
Corning entered the 1998 Republican gubernatorial primary, making history as the first woman to run for the Republican nomination to the office of governor in the state’s history. After an abbreviated gubernatorial campaign, she was forced to drop out due in large part to a lack of financial support.

Political positions
Corning has long been recognized as a leader among moderates and social liberals within the Republican Party. Corning was state Captain of the Republican Leadership Council.

A vocal proponent of abortion rights, Corning served on the Board of Directors for Iowa’s chapter of Planned Parenthood and even led that organization’s fundraising drive in 2002.

A proponent of gay rights, on May 12, 2009, Corning received the "Interfaith Award" along with the woman who followed her as Lt. Governor, Sally Pederson. The award was presented by the Interfaith Alliance of Iowa, and came after a joint letter to the editor of the Des Moines Register penned by the pair of former Lieutenant Governors promoting gay marriage.

Death
Corning died May 20, 2017, from a liver condition.

She was awarded the 2017 Edward S. Allen Award by the ACLU of Iowa in August 2017.

See also
List of female lieutenant governors in the United States

References

External links

1932 births
2017 deaths
Lieutenant Governors of Iowa
Politicians from Des Moines, Iowa
University of Northern Iowa alumni
Republican Party Iowa state senators
Women state legislators in Iowa
People from Adair County, Iowa
People from Cedar Falls, Iowa
School board members in Iowa
21st-century American women